Yao Haijun is the editor-in-chief of Science Fiction World (科幻世界, SFW). Yao has been editor of SFW since 1998. He has also served as the chief editor of 《世界科幻大师丛书》 ("Work of World SF Masters"), which is a book series of sci-fi.

Early life 
Yao was born in a farm in Yichun in Heilongjiang Province. A sci-fi book borrowed from maths teacher aroused his initial interest in sci-fi fiction. He raised money to launch a sci-fi magazine called "nebulae". The magazine serves as a fan magazine, which published book reviews and sci-fi news. The magazine put up a bridge of communication among publishers, writers and readers.

Career at SFW 
Yao was invited to work as an editor of SFW by Yangxiao, who was then the editor-in-chief of SFW. Firstly, Yao worked as an editor during June 1998 to June 2002, an assistant chief editor during June 2002 to March 2003, associate editor during March 2003 to October 2005, and the chief editor from October 2005 till now.

Collection of World SF Masters 
Although the SFW has a circulation of 200,000 copies per issue, it's a hard work to publish sci-fi books in China.  The delivery department worried that they will incur economic deficits, but Yao persuaded them. The Collection of World SF Masters proved to be a great success.

Books Series published 

Yao works as the chief editor of book series as below

"Cornerstone of Chinese Science Fiction"

"Popular Science Fiction of the World"

"Work of World SF Masters"(世界科幻大师丛书)

"Work of World Fantasy Masters"

"Three Body Problem" written by Liu Cixin is one of a set of "Cornerstone of Chinese Science Fiction". The circulation of "Three Body Problem" is more than seven hundred thousand.

References

Chinese magazine editors
Living people
People from Yichun, Heilongjiang
Year of birth missing (living people)